John Roland Clifford Yorke (born 9 July 1962) is a British television producer and script editor, who was head of Channel 4 Drama 2003-2005, controller of BBC drama production 2006-2012 and MD of Company Pictures (2013-2015).

Outside of television production, Yorke authored Into the Woods: How Stories Work and Why We Tell Them (2014), a best-selling screenwriting guide that proposes a five act structure to film and television narrative and draws from Yorke's research and experience.

Career

Background
Yorke attended Newcastle University. He joined the BBC in 1986, working initially in radio as a studio manager and then as a producer on BBC Radio 5.

Early career - the 1990s and EastEnders
In 1994, he moved to television, working as a script editor on EastEnders before becoming the storyline consultant on Casualty. In 1999, after a brief period as producer on Sunburn, he took on the executive producer role on EastEnders. During his time there, he was given the task of introducing the soap's fourth weekly episode.

He axed the majority of the Di Marco family, and helped introduce popular characters such as the Slater family. As what Mal Young described as "two of EastEnders most successful years", Yorke was responsible for big ratings winners such as "Who Shot Phil?", Ethel Skinner's death, Jim Branning and Dot Cotton's marriage, abusive Trevor Morgan, and Kat Slater's revelation to her daughter Zoe that she was her mother. Yorke was also responsible for Kim Medcalf being cast in the role of Sam Mitchell in January 2002, after Danniella Westbrook's drug addiction left her unsuitable for the role.

The 2000s
In May 2002, he left the soap for a senior position under Mal Young in the BBC's in-house Drama Series team, but soon after he left to work for Channel 4 as the Head of Drama in 2003. At Channel 4, he commissioned series such as Shameless, Sex Traffic and the critically acclaimed Omagh. In 2005, it was announced he would return to the BBC, taking over Mal Young's position, as Controller of BBC Drama Series, and, in addition, Co-Head of Independent Drama Commissioning (i.e. programmes made for the BBC by independent production companies, rather than in-house).

One of the reasons he returned was to set around reversing the fortunes of EastEnders, which had been receiving low ratings in comparison to the past. The results were mixed. As Controller of Continuing Drama Series, he has been ultimately responsible for overseeing some of the most popular programmes on British television, including EastEnders, Casualty, Holby City and Doctors.

In 2005, Yorke founded the BBC Writers Academy, a year-long training scheme for aspiring television writers.

In 2009, he was made controller of the newly formed BBC Drama Production – a merger of Continuing Series and Series and Serials. While at the BBC, Yorke has been Commissioning Editor/Executive Producer for Life on Mars, Robin Hood, Bodies, The Street, A Class Apart, Waterloo Road and HolbyBlue, as well as looking after various series of Spooks, Hustle and New Tricks.

The 2010s
In 2010, Yorke's job title was changed to that of Controller Continuing Drama Production Studios. He was the executive producer of the Internet spin-off EastEnders: E20 and BBC daytime drama, Land Girls.

In March 2012, Yorke became acting editor of radio soap The Archers while Vanessa Whitburn took long service leave.

He left the BBC again later in 2012. In 2013, he was an executive producer of Truckers and Skins, and the following year, The Missing.

He was a regular writer on Red Rock, writing six episodes between 2015 and 2016.

He also wrote two episodes of Casualty between 2016 and 2017.

Return to EastEnders
In June 2017, it was announced that EastEnders executive producer Sean O'Connor had stepped down and would be temporarily replaced by Yorke as executive consultant. Yorke announced that he would be staying with the show for a year, longer than his original three months he was contracted to.

Under Yorke EastEnders won its first BAFTA for Continuing Drama in three years – and the last one to date.

TV shows commissioned by Yorke

Waterloo Road 
Waterloo Road was commissioned by Yorke on his arrival at the BBC from Channel 4. Briefed to find a new returning pre-watershed drama, Yorke approached Shed Productions – makers of Bad Girls and Footballers Wives who had never before had a show on the BBC. During conversations Yorke hit on the idea of a School Precinct and Anne McManus and Maureen Chadwick quickly wrote a pilot episode.

Waterloo Road was launched to huge commercial – if not critical success.  After the first series Yorke asked Anne Mensah – then assistant commissioning editor – if she would take over, and under Mensah the show moved to BBC Scotland.

The show aired from 2006-2015. In September 2021, it was announced that Waterloo Road was to be revived after six years.

Father Brown 
The initial idea for Father Brown, a series based on the books by GK Chesterton, came from Yorke after he heard a Radio 4 programme on Chesterton’s creation the previous evening. Liam Keelan, then controller of BBC Daytime, commissioned the first season and Yorke asked two of his former BBC Writers Academy students to create the show – Rachel Flowerday and Tahsin Guner.

It aired in January 2013 on BBC One and Yorke stayed as Executive Producer for the show for two seasons. With a ninth series in production for 2022, it’s the second longest-running daytime drama series broadcast on BBC Television.

Life on Mars 
When Yorke became head of Channel 4 Drama one of the first shows he wanted develop was Life on Mars, but according to show writer Ashley Pharoah, broadcasters had been ‘very anxious about it as a concept’. Although Yorke redeveloped the original script over 18 months so it became less violent and with a greater emphasis on ‘story of the week’, it was ultimately turned down by director of programmes Kevin Lygo.

Yorke eventually left Channel 4 to become controller of BBC Drama Production where the show was green lit by Julie Gardner, BBC Wales Head of Drama. Yorke acted as joint commissioning editor for the show’s entire run (2006 – 2007).

The Street 
Yorke worked with Brookside writer Jimmy McGovern on the idea that became The Street. While rejected by Channel 4, Yorke was able to take the project with him when he returned to the BBC.

References

External links
EastEnders: Faith, Morality and Hope in the Community, Speech by John Yorke

Into The Woods Official Site

1962 births
Living people
Alumni of Newcastle University
British television producers
British instructional writers
English television producers
Screenwriting instructors
Soap opera producers
Writers of books about writing fiction